Ortharbela sommerlattei is a moth in the family Cossidae. It is found in Tanzania, where it has been recorded from the East Usambara Mountains. The habitat consists of submontane forests.

The length of the forewings is about 7.9 mm. The forewings are sepia with several sayal brown spots with a sepia edge. The hindwings are olive brown.

Etymology
The species is named for Dr Malte Walter Ludwig Sommerlatte.

References

Natural History Museum Lepidoptera generic names catalog

Endemic fauna of Tanzania
Metarbelinae
Moths described in 2008